Oleksiy Mykhaylovych Pavlenko (born 2 January 1977 in Uman) is a Ukrainian businessman and politician who was Minister of Agrarian Policy and Food in the Yatsenyuk Government.

Pavlenko studied at Kyiv-Mohyla Academy and Nyenrode Business University.

Pavlenko resigned on 29 January 2016; but he withdraw his letter of resignation 6 days later.

Until 4 February 2016 Pavlenko represented the party Self Reliance; but that day leader of Self Reliance parliamentary faction Oleh Berezyuk stated that Pavlenko no longer represented his party in the second Yatsenyuk Government. He did not retain his post in the Groysman Government that was installed in 14 April 2016.

Biography 
Born on January 2, 1977, in Uman, Cherkasy region.

Education 
In 1998 graduated from National University of “Kyiv-Mohyla Academy” (bachelor in economics).

In 1999 gained a “finance specialist” level at International privatization center (International business school).

In 2000 got a master's degree of “International management” at Ukrainian Academy of foreign trade.

In 2001-2002 studied at Nyenrode Business School, Netherlands, where received an MBA level (Masters of Business Administration)

Got scientific level of “Professor of economics” (in 2010), thesis “Meat and meat products import regulation in case of Ukrainian euro integration”

Work experience 
In 1997-2001 supervisor at KPMG Ukraine

In 2001 a management consultant at ABN AMRO, Amsterdam, Netherlands

In 2002-2003 Member of an Audit Committee, Head of Restructuring team and Business Development team with Damen Shipyards Group (Netherlands), provided projects realization in Ukraine, Romania and Netherlands

In 2004-2006 CEO of Rise Group (Ukraine), responsible for general, strategic and investment management of the Group in Ukraine, Russia and Moldova. Implemented efficient budget and control systems.

In 2007-2009 Chief Executive Officer of Foxtrot, responsible for general and investment management in Ukraine and Moldova within 15000 employees.

From 2009 Member of Advisory Board  of National University of Kyiv-Mohyla Academy, member of initiative and coordination group “First professional reformation government”

From 2012 member of international Young Presidents` Organization and CEO club Ukraine since 2013

From 2013 till becoming a head of Agricultural Ministry was a  Member of Supervisory Board at “European milk technologies”, consulted Agroprogress Holding Ltd and Forum Capital about investments into agricultural sector.

From 2014 till 2016 held the position of Minister of Agrarian Policy and Food of Ukraine.

From 2015 Member of the Supervisory Board of National University of Life and Environmental Sciences of Ukraine (NULES).

From 2016 Director of Program for Agro-Industry Development, Ukrainian Institute for the Future.

From 2017 Chairman of the Ukrainian-Dutch Business Council.

References

Publications with Oleksiy Pavlenko 
 The EU will help to implementat the developing strategy of agricultural sector
 American-Ukrainian conference for support domestic business
 Investment conference New Ukraine
 Oleksiy Pavlenko at BBC World News Business Edition (06.03.2015)
 Oleksiy Pavlenko at BBC World News Today (06.03.2015)
 Oleksiy Pavlenko interview (Sky News channel, 06.03.2015)
 Canada and Israel sighned the Memorandum to support the Ukrainian fruit and vegetable farms
 International support for Ukraine conference
 Seeds of change: Ukrainian minister seeks to bolster country’s agriculture

 	 

1977 births
Living people
People from Uman
National University of Kyiv-Mohyla Academy alumni
21st-century Ukrainian economists
21st-century Ukrainian businesspeople
Agriculture ministers of Ukraine